Rambo: Last Blood is a 2019 American action film directed by Adrian Grünberg. The screenplay was co-written by Matthew Cirulnick and Sylvester Stallone, from a story by Dan Gordon and Stallone, and is based on the character John Rambo created by author David Morrell for his novel First Blood. A sequel to Rambo (2008), it is the fifth installment in the Rambo franchise and stars Stallone as Rambo, alongside Paz Vega, Sergio Peris-Mencheta, Adriana Barraza, Yvette Monreal, Genie Kim aka Yenah Han, Joaquín Cosío, and Oscar Jaenada. In the film, Rambo travels to Mexico to save his adopted niece, who has been kidnapped by a Mexican cartel and forced into prostitution.

Plans for a fifth film were announced on and off again since 2008, with different iterations developed and cancelled. The film was finally announced in May 2018, with Grünberg attached to direct. Principal photography began in October 2018 in Bulgaria and Spain and ended in December 2018, with additional photography in May 2019. Brian Tyler returned to score the film.

Rambo: Last Blood was theatrically released on September 20, 2019, to negative reviews, with criticisms aimed at the script, graphic violence, and accusations of racist and xenophobic attitudes toward Mexico, though Stallone received some praise for his return in the lead role. The film grossed $91.5 million worldwide against a production budget of $50 million and print and advertisement costs of $30 million.

Plot 

Eleven years after the events in Burma, Vietnam War veteran John Rambo lives in Bowie, Arizona at his deceased father's horse ranch, which he manages with his old friend, Maria Beltran, and her granddaughter, Gabriela. She informs them that her friend Gizelle had found Gabriela's deadbeat father, Manuel, in Mexico. Despite their protests, Gabriela secretly travels to Mexico where Gizelle leads her to Manual's apartment. When she asks him why he abandoned Gabriela and her mother, he coldly reveals that he never cared for either of them.
 
Gizelle takes a heartbroken Gabriela to a nearby club, where she is drugged and kidnapped by the enforcers of a Mexican cartel. After learning of Gabriela's disappearance, Rambo rushes to Mexico and interrogates both Manuel and Gizelle about Gabriela's whereabouts. Gizelle reluctantly leads Rambo to the club where Gabriela was last seen, and Rambo confronts El Flaco, the man who last spoke with Gabriela. A mysterious woman, Carmen Delgado, tails Rambo as El Flaco leads him to Gabriela's supposed location. Rambo is confronted, beaten and marked by the cartel, led by the brothers Hugo and Victor Martinez. They take his driver's license, revealing the location of the ranch and a photo of Gabriela, whom Victor recognizes. The cartel vow to mistreat Gabriela further due to Rambo's actions.

Carmen takes Rambo back to her home where she cares for him until he fully recovers. Meanwhile, Gabriela is consistently dosed with heroin and sold to be a sex slave. Carmen says she is an independent journalist who has been investigating the Martinez brothers, who had kidnapped and murdered her sister. Rambo later raids one of the brothels, killing several men until he finds a drugged Gabriela. While driving back home, Rambo thanks Gabriela for giving him hope and meaning for the last ten years but she dies from an overdose. An enraged Rambo sends Maria away and rigs the ranch with traps for a confrontation, and later returns to Mexico to ask for Carmen's help in finding Victor. Carmen initially refuses, telling Rambo that it will solve nothing but is convinced after he appeals to her grief and frustrations.

Rambo raids Victor's home, killing several guards and decapitates Victor. In retaliation, Hugo leads a group of hitmen to Rambo's ranch, where each falls victim to the rigged traps. Saving Hugo for last, Rambo uses his bowie knife and cuts him open and rips out his heart. In the aftermath, a weakened Rambo sits on the porch of his father's house, vowing to continue fighting and keep the memories of his loved ones alive. During the credits, flashbacks of Rambo's battles from the past films are shown, with Rambo saddling up his horse and riding off into the sunset.

Cast 

Louis Mandylor and Aaron Cohen portrayed Sheriff and State Police Captain in the opening scene of the extended cut, respectively.

Production

Development and writing 
In February 2008, Sylvester Stallone revealed that making a fifth film would depend on the success of the fourth film, stating he was "gearing one up" and that it would "be quite different". In March 2008, Stallone revealed he was "half-way through" writing Rambo V, stating that it would not be another war movie, with Bulgaria being considered to double as Rambo's home in Arizona. In February 2009, Stallone revealed that he was proceeding with the fifth film, but stated, "The conflict is whether to do it in America or a foreign country."

In August 2009, Millennium Films greenlit the film with Stallone writing, directing, and starring. At that time, the plot focused on Rambo battling human traffickers and drug lords to rescue a young girl abducted near the U.S.–Mexico border. In September 2009, Stallone revealed that the film was titled Rambo V: The Savage Hunt, and would instead be loosely based on the novel Hunter by James Byron Huggins. The plot was reconceptualized to focus on Rambo leading an elite special forces kill team to hunt and kill a genetically engineered creature. Nu Image/Millennium Films released a concept art poster, and official synopsis for The Savage Hunt. By November 2009 however, the plot had reverted to the story written by Stallone, involving Rambo crossing the Mexican border to rescue a girl who had been kidnapped.

In May 2010, Stallone revealed he was "done" with the character, stating, "I think Rambo's pretty well done. I don't think there'll be any more. I'm about 99% sure I was going to do it ... but I feel that with Rocky Balboa, that character came complete circle. He went home. But for Rambo to go on another adventure might be, I think, misinterpreted as a mercenary gesture and not necessary. I don't want that to happen." At the 2010 Cannes Film Festival, Millennium Films and Nu Image advertised the film, now titled Rambo V, with handout poster cards. Despite this, Stallone stated that he wasn't involved with the created posters and that the studio had told him that if he doesn't make the film they'll find someone else to complete it. He stated he wanted the franchise to end, and expressed being comfortable with the idea.

In 2011, Sean Hood was hired to write a new script titled Rambo: Last Stand, which he described as "more in line with the small-town thriller of First Blood". In 2012, Hood revealed that Rambo V had been put on hold in order for Stallone to finish The Expendables 2. Hood also revealed his uncertainty on whether the film would be similar to Unforgiven or a "passing-of-the-torch". In August 2013, it was announced that Entertainment One and Nu Image would develop and produce a Rambo TV series with Stallone. In June 2014, German film company Splendid Films confirmed that Stallone had started writing the script for Rambo V, which he described as similar to No Country for Old Men. In September 2014, the film was officially titled Rambo: Last Blood, with Stallone also serving as director.

In 2015, Stallone and Rambo creator/author David Morrell re-wrote the story for Rambo V. Stallone wanted a "soulful journey" for the character that the author described as a "really emotional, powerful story". Stallone pitched the idea to the producers, but they wanted to proceed with the human trafficking story instead, leaving Stallone and Morrell's script abandoned. In October 2015, Stallone expressed interest in a prequel project, stating: "It's intriguing to find the whys and wherefores of how people have become what they are. The traumas, the loss and the tragedy of being in Vietnam would certainly be a great challenge for a young actor, and it would be ironic that Rambo directs younger Rambo having played it for twenty years plus." By January 2016, Stallone stated that Rambo V would not enter production.

Pre-production 
In May 2018, the film was re-announced to be in development initially as Rambo V, with principal photography scheduled for that September. The plot was confirmed to focus on Rambo combating a Mexican drug cartel following their abduction of one of his family members. Stallone announced the release date for the film, which he would also be co-writing with Matthew Cirulnick. At that time, he expressed uncertainty in additionally serving as director. In August 2018, Adrian Grünberg was announced as the director. In September 2018, Adriana Barraza was added to the cast. In October 2018, Paz Vega, Yvette Monreal, Sergio Peris-Mencheta, Oscar Jaenada, and Joaquín Cosío were cast. In May 2019, Louis Mandylor, Sheila Shah, Dimitri Vegas, and Genie Kim (aka Yenah Han) were revealed to have been cast without prior announcement.

Filming 
Principal photography began on October 2, 2018 in Bulgaria. It was previously scheduled to begin on September 1, 2018, and before that on October 27, 2014, in Shreveport, Louisiana. Barraza filmed her scenes in Tenerife (Canary Islands). Principal photography was completed on December 4, 2018. Additional photography took place at the end of May 2019.

Music 

Brian Tyler, who composed for Stallone on Rambo and The Expendables trilogy, returned to score Rambo: Last Blood. Tyler shared his scoring process with Dread Central:

 Rambo: Last Blood is a very emotional story and the music needed to reflect the tone that the director, Adrian Grunberg, set so beautifully. I wrote a series of heartfelt and passionate themes that echo Rambo's yearning for family, justice, requital, and compassion. These ideas created a tonal tension that was both challenging and rewarding as a composer. Lush strings, massive brass, thunderous percussion, delicate piano, and harrowing trumpet duets echoed the themes of loss, regret, hope, and vengeance. It has been an incredible ride composing for this timeless character.

Release

Marketing 
In May 2018, Millennium Films brought the project to Cannes to generate interest and sales. Stallone verified that he would share images and videos from the film's set on his Instagram as the film approached its release. In February 2019, Stallone revealed images on his Instagram of Rambo's adopted family, combat history, and the character Gabriela's intentions to travel to Mexico to find her father. In March 2019, Stallone revealed via his Instagram an image of Rambo covered in blood and aiming his signature bow.

In May 2019, it was revealed that Stallone will present exclusive images at Cannes to coincide with a special "first-look" screening of the film at the Palais des Festivals et des Congrès on May 24, 2019. The first trailer was revealed at Cannes on May 24, 2019. The teaser trailer was released on May 30, 2019 and drew comparisons to Logan and Unforgiven. A remixed version of the song "Old Town Road" was used for the teaser. On August 1, 2019, Stallone revealed the theatrical release poster on his Instagram. On August 20, 2019, Stallone released the second trailer on his Instagram. On September 4, 2019, Alamo Drafthouse Cinema announced it would host a marathon of all five Rambo films to commemorate the release of Rambo: Last Blood. Deadline Hollywood reported that P&A costs were under $30 million.

Theatrical 
Rambo: Last Blood was released theatrically in the United States on September 20, 2019. Dadi purchased the Chinese distribution rights and agreed to an eight-figure co-financing deal. On July 30, 2019, the MPAA assigned the film an R rating. The British Board of Film Classification classified the film at 18. The film was released theatrically in Japan on June 26, 2020 by Gaga Corporation.

International version 
Lionsgate released two different theatrical cuts of Rambo: Last Blood, varying by country. In the United States, United Kingdom, and Canada, the film runs 89 minutes; in Australia, Mexico, Sweden, Brazil, Finland, Germany and Japan, it runs 101 minutes. The latter version contains several deleted scenes and an alternate opening, which runs approximately 10 minutes:
It starts in a rainstorm in the middle of a rescue: 3 missing hikers in danger of getting caught in a flood. The police say they have to stop the search as it's getting too dangerous and ask where the volunteer on horseback is. We are then introduced to Rambo in the woods tracking the hikers, he finds a girl dead then further down finds the other two. He's trying to get them out but one guy won't leave without his wife. Rambo tells him she's dead but he runs off, the flood water starts running down and Rambo ties himself and the girl to a rock while the initial rush of water cascades over them. He then returns to the base with the girl and sees the guy who ran off getting his body bag loaded into an ambulance which triggers his PTSD, the girl thanks him and Rambo returns home and has a conversation with the old lady living in the house about when he returned and how his father used to sit in the rocking chair outside.

He then goes into the tunnels clearly upset about the events and puts a CD on (The Doors). … When he has PTSD flashbacks in the tunnels it is intercut with the dead hiker.

After the alternate opening, the film cuts to Rambo on his ranch, as it begins in select North American countries and the UK.

Home media 
Rambo: Last Blood was released on Digital on December 3, 2019, and was released on Ultra HD Blu-ray, Blu-ray, and DVD on December 17, 2019 by Lionsgate Home Entertainment. Best Buy released a retail exclusive steelbook for the 4K UHD release. The film has topped Redbox's disc rental and On Demand charts for several weeks. The international version, titled Rambo: Last Blood Extended Cut, was released on Amazon Prime Video in May 2020. In the United States and Canada, the DVD earned $10 million and the Blu-ray earned $16.6 million, totaling $26.6 million in domestic video sales.

Reception

Box office 
Rambo: Last Blood grossed $44.8 million in the United States and Canada, and $46.7 million in other territories, for a worldwide total of $91.5 million, against a production budget of $50 million.

In the United States and Canada, the film was released alongside Ad Astra and Downton Abbey, and was projected to gross $23–25 million from 3,618 theaters in its opening weekend. The film made $7.17 million on Friday, which included $1.3 million from Thursday night previews. It went on to debut to $19 million, finishing third and marking the second-best opening of the series. The film made $8.6 million in its second weekend and $3.6 million in its third, finishing sixth and eighth, respectively.

Critical response 
The site's critical consensus states, "Like the sequels that preceded it, Rambo: Last Blood is content to indulge in bloody violence at the expense of its main character's once-poignant story." Audiences polled by CinemaScore gave the film an average grade of "B" on an A+ to F scale, while those surveyed by PostTrak gave it an average 3.5 out of 5 stars and a 56% "definite recommend."

The portrayal of the Rambo character was put under scrutiny. Writing for the Los Angeles Times, Kenneth Turan gave the film 3 out of 4 stars and was complimentary of the story's "surprisingly brooding examination" of Rambo: "Sure, Rambo is convincing when he ends up telling bad people, 'I'm gonna hurt you real bad,' but there is also a kind of fragility that makes us worry about people putting the hurt on him." Peter Debruge wrote a negative review for Variety: "This character is a mess of contradictions, representing on one hand the permanent damage that military service can do to one's soul while simultaneously suggesting what the ideal soldier looks like." Rating the film 4.5 out of 10 for IGN, Witney Seibold lamented, "A character who was originally meant to stand as a symbol for the damage that war can do to a soldier is now best remembered as an unkillable human machine gun", but credited Stallone with "[managing] to give as soulful a performance as the part warrants".

The script by Stallone and Matthew Cirulnick attained unfavorable reactions. In a negative review for The Hollywood Reporter, Frank Scheck said it "feels utterly tossed-off and generic, more resembling the pilot for a Rambo television series than a proper send off", but credited Stallone with "[keeping] a franchise afloat". Katie Walsh of the Chicago Tribune, who gave the film 1 out of 4 stars, called the script "barely a script at all" and the writing lazy; she added that story writers Stallone and Dan Gordon "trade on charged imagery rather than, you know, actually writing characters that fully express the spectrum of human morality". William Bibbiani of Bloody Disgusting said the script "has been reduced to its lowest common denominators, establishing characters quickly and then shoving them into a simplistic plot (that is to say, simplistic even by Rambo standards)", and rated the film 1.5 out of 5. Grading the film a D+ for IndieWire, Eric Kohn said Stallone as a co-writer "does a decent job at generating empathy for Rambo through furtive gestures, but Last Blood goes overboard to prove that he's tried to be a better man". While many called the plot of Last Blood derivative of Taken, web-based critic James Berardinelli called it "a Death Wish variant with a few callbacks to the trap-building of First Blood".

Critics reported being appalled by the brutality of the action scenes, with some comparing its amount of gore with that of a slasher film. Berardinelli said, "The body count is insanely high and the methods of death are worthy of a Halloween or Friday the 13th sequel", and gave the film 1 out of 4 stars. Debruge called the violence "horrible, gut-wrenching carnage to witness, and yet, it's been calibrated to elicit whoops and cheers from fans, who've faithfully followed along as Rambo evolved". Vince Mancini of Uproxx said, "It's so genuinely horrific I'm convinced there are real-life cartel videos celebrating the torture of rivals that are less gory", but recommended the film as a must-see. Conversely, Johnny Oleksinski of the New York Post said, "Rambo: Last Blood features what's easily the most violent movie scene of the year. It's awesome", but felt the narration, drama, and hackneyed backstory could have been edited out. Duncan Bowles of Den of Geek gave it 3 out of 5 stars, writing: "If you're not the kind of person who wants to weep with joy at the sight of Rambo tooling up, firing a bow, or rigging booby traps, then the film really isn't for you, but if you're after a solid display of carnage from a character you love, then there's plenty on offer." Many saw the climax of Last Blood as similar to that of Home Alone, which, by contrast, is rated PG.

The depiction of a crime infested Mexico and the stereotypical portrayal of most Mexicans and Latinos as criminals prompted critics to accuse the film of racism, xenophobia, and pandering to supporters of the Trump presidency. Peter Bradshaw of The Guardian called Last Blood a "massively enlarged prostate of a film [that] can only make you wince with its badly acted geronto-ultraviolence, its Trumpian fantasies of Mexican rapists and hilariously insecure US border, and its crass enthusiasm for rape-revenge attacks", giving it 1 out of 5 stars. Seibold wrote: "I understand that Rambo films have rarely been bastions of cultural togetherness, but in 2019, these broad stereotypes are offensive and dated and downright irresponsible." Kohn wrote: "In 2019's hypersensitive cultural environment, the depiction of murderous Mexican crime bosses and their cowering sex slaves encountering a literal white savior doesn't go down so easy." Mexican film critic Gerardo Valero, a "far-flung correspondent" for RogerEbert.com, also criticized the use of Spain doubling for Mexico, and that it was "impossible not to laugh at this group of Spanish actors trying to sound Mexican by cursing with every other word in this strange accent". He also wrote: "If this movie wasn't so dumb, I would have probably found all of this offensive." Addressing the complaints about the stereotypical villains, however, Bowles wrote: "The villains might be built from the stereotypical strain of pure evil from years past, but their reprehensibility is what makes the explosive payback work and the violence, despite some especially grim moments, never quite strays into the extreme stomach churning highs from part IV."

David Morrell, creator of the Rambo character and author of the First Blood novel, tweeted that he disliked Last Blood, calling it "a mess" and feeling "embarrassed to have my name associated with it". Morrell later told Newsweek:

I felt degraded and dehumanized after I left the theater. Instead of being soulful, this new movie lacks one. I felt I was less a human being for having seen it, and today that's an unfortunate message ... [Trackdown] is typical of ultra-violent 1970s exploitation "grindhouse" films, the technique of which Rambo: Last Blood resembles. The sets here look cheap. The direction is awkward. ... Rambo could be called John Smith, and the film wouldn't change. It assumes the audience is familiar with Rambo's background, whereas anyone under 40 will wonder what on Earth is going on with those tunnels.

Analysis 
Darren Mooney of The Escapist wrote, "Rambo has adopted the methodology of the Viet Cong by building elaborate tunnels under his family farm." Zak Wojnar of Screen Rant stated that "Rambo's tunnels are much larger and more sanitary than those of Củ Chi, but the imagery is comparable", adding that they are "where he holds his demons, where he channels his negative energy, and where he keeps his past close, but contained." As for the final act of the film, Wojnar stated that "his 'PTSD Tunnels' play a key role in his revenge", writing: "Using the same guerilla tactics that were likely used on him and his friends fifty years ago, Rambo emerges from his tunnels like a Vietnamese fighter popping out of a spider hole, shoots several targets, and then disappears underground before they even know what hit them."

Accolades

Future 
During Cannes 2019, Stallone said he would continue portraying Rambo if the fifth film succeeds. Grünberg, however, said that Rambo: Last Blood "closes the circle", hoping it would conclude the film series. In September 2019, Stallone confirmed that he has plans for a prequel to the series; although he would not reprise the title role, he would like to explore who Rambo was before the war: 

In September 2019, Stallone had expressed interest in having Rambo take refuge in an Indian reservation for a potential sixth film. In June 2020, Stallone briefly elaborated on the idea, stating, "If I ever did another one, I think he would go back to the Indian reservation that he grew up on because he has Indian family."

Notes

References

External links 

 
 
 
 

2019 films
2019 action films
American films about revenge
American action thriller films
American sequel films
American splatter films
American vigilante films
Balboa Productions films
Films about child abduction
Films about child prostitution
Films about human trafficking
Films about Mexican drug cartels
Films scored by Brian Tyler
Films set in Arizona
Films set in Mexico
Films set on farms
Films shot in Bulgaria
Films shot in Louisiana
Films shot in the Canary Islands
Obscenity controversies in film
Race-related controversies in film
Political controversies in film
Lionsgate films
Nu Image films
Rambo (franchise)
2010s Spanish-language films
Works about sex trafficking
Works about Mexican drug cartels
Films about Mexican Americans
Films about post-traumatic stress disorder
Golden Raspberry Award winning films
2010s English-language films
2010s American films
2010s Mexican films
2010s vigilante films